Scilla is a genus of about 30 to 80 species of bulb-forming perennial herbaceous plants in the family Asparagaceae, subfamily Scilloideae. Sometimes called the squills in English, they are native to woodlands, subalpine meadows, and seashores throughout Europe, Africa and the Middle East. A few species are also naturalized in Australasia and North America. Their flowers are usually blue, but white, pink, and purple types are known; most flower in early spring, but a few are autumn-flowering. Several Scilla species are valued as ornamental garden plants.

Taxonomy 

Species of Scilla have been known since classical antiquity, being described by both Greek (Theophrastus (371–287 BC) and Discorides (40–90 AD)) and Roman (Pliny (23–79 AD)) writers. Theophrastus described Scilla hyacinthoides (skilla), and more briefly S. autumnalis and S. bifolia in his Historia plantarum, where he mentions "those of squill" (σκῐ́λλης; skilles). In classical literature, Scilla was known for its medicinal properties. Later mentions include pre-Linnaen botanists such as Fuchs (1542) and Clusius (1601), who considered many closely related plants to be types of Hyacinthus.

The genus Scilla has a long and complicated history in terms of its classification, circumscription and subdivision, and is not fully resolved.The genus Scilla was first formally described by Linnaeus in 1753, and hence bears his name as the botanical authority, Scilla L.. In Scilla, he included a six plants previously considered as Hyacinthus. For instance, he renamed Clusius' Hyacinthus stellatus cinerei coloris as Scilla italica (Hyacinthoides italica in modern systems) and Hyacinthus stellatus peruanus as Scilla peruviana, while Fuchs' Hyacinthus caeruleus mas minor, he named Scilla bifolia. 

In all, Linnaeus listed eight species of Scilla, from the Mediterranean area, Europe and southwest Asia, and placed the genus in the grouping Hexandria Monogynia (6 stamens, 1 pistil) within his system of sexual classification (systema sexuale). Since he listed S. maritima (which had previously been known as scilla officinale) first this, was considered the type species. On the basis that the seed morphology distinguished this species from all the other Linnean Scilla, Steinheil reclassified it as a member of a novel genus, Urginea, now submerged in Drimia as Drimia maritima.

Later, De Jussieu (1789), using a natural system, the relative value of plant characteristics, rather than purely sexual ones, and a hierarchical system of ranks, grouped Scilla into a "family" which he called Asphodeli, along with Hyacinthus and Allium. Jaume-Saint-Hilaire (1805), while maintaining the same affiliation, recognized three species S. maritima, S. amoena and S. italica. By 1853, Lindley had created a very large order, the Liliaceae, in which Scilla and related genera formed one of eleven suborders, as Scilleae. This included many genera, including Camassia and Ornithogalum. Treatments of Scilla in the nineteenth century include those of Dumortier (1827), Salisbury (1796, 1866) and Baker (1873), with rather different approaches.

Historically, Scilla and related genera were placed with lily-like plants in the order Liliales, for instance as the tribe Hyacintheae of the family Liliaceae. The availability of molecular phylogenetic methods in taxonomic classification led to major realignments of several related monocot orders, particularly with the adoption of the Angiosperm Phylogeny Group system. Significantly, hyacinth-like plants including Scilla were initially placed in a separate family, the Hyacinthaceae in the order Asparagales, specifically in the very large subfamily Hyacinthoideae. Since 2009, the Hyacintheae, including Scilla, have been considered as Scilloideae, a subfamily of the family Asparagaceae. There they are placed as one of about 21 genera in the subtribe Hyacinthinae within tribe Hyacintheae. The most closely related genera to Scilla were Muscari Mill. and Chionodoxa Boiss.

Subdivision 

For some time, Chionodoxa had been considered a possible synonym to Scilla bifolia L. and molecular methods failed to support the existence of a separate genus, but rather its specimens appeared intermixed with those of Scilla. Although there are distinguishing morphological features (e.g fused tepal bases and broadened filaments), these were considered paraphyletic, having arisen in several lines within the Hyacinthaceae. Furthermore, it was observed that Chionodoxa was capable of hybridization with Scilla bifolia. It was therefore proposed that Chionodoxa be considered an obsolete genus and be submerged within Scilla. 

Subsequently it was proposed that the species of Scilla be split into two sections, Chionodoxa that would include those taxa previously considered to belong in the genus Chionodoxa, and Scilla which would contain the remainder.

Species 

The precise number of Scilla species in the genus depends on which proposals to split the genus are accepted. In addition to creating two sections, some authorities have split the genus into a number of smaller genera. For instance, particularly the Eurasian species have been moved to genera such as Othocallis Salisb., so that Scilla siberica would become Othocallis siberica, leaving a much smaller genus referred to as Scilla s.s. or Scilla sensu Speta, with about 30 species. But this has not been generally accepted, leaving a much larger Scilla s.l. of about 80 species. Although the Flora of North America mentions (but does not list) 50 species, World Flora Online lists 83 species, as of May 2022. Speta's scheme (1998) created 8 separate genera, but many of these are very narrowly defined being either monotypic (single species) or oligotypic (very few species).

Etymology 

Both the scientific genus name Scilla and the common word squill derive, via Middle English and French from the Latin scilla and Greek  skilla words for the plants. The common name squill has been applied to a number of other similar taxa such as Drimia.

Distribution and habitat 

Native to woodlands, subalpine meadows, and seashores throughout Europe, especially the Mediterranean, Africa, especially South Africa, Eurasia, especially southwest Asia and the Middle East. A few species are also widely naturalized, particularly in Australia, New Zealand and North America.

Cultivation and uses
Many Scilla species, notably S. siberica and members of section Chionodoxa, are grown in gardens for their attractive early spring flowers.

Notes

References

Bibliography

Books

Historical sources (chronological) 

 
 
 
  (also at Botanicus: Rariorum plantarum  )
 , see also Species Plantarum

Articles

Websites 

 
  
 
  
  (see also Angiosperm Phylogeny Website) ''
 
 
 
 

 
Asparagaceae genera